Ryan Gregg Carnes (born November 21, 1982) is an American actor. He is most known for playing the adult Lucas Jones on the ABC soap opera General Hospital.

Career
Born in Pittsfield, Illinois, he attended Duke University, where he was a member of the Duke University Marching Band.

In 2003, Carnes was part of a national campaign for Nintendo. Carnes first started acting in 2004 when he became the ninth actor to portray Lucas Jones on the ABC opera General Hospital from July 2004 until September 2005. After he left General Hospital, he was replaced by Ben Hogestyn. From 2004 to 2006, Carnes had a recurring role on Desperate Housewives as Justin, the love interest of Andrew Van de Kamp, played by Shawn Pyfrom. Carnes starred in the 2004 film Eating Out and the 2006 film Surf School. He also starred in the video for the song "Mistake" by Australian actress and singer Stephanie McIntosh.

Carnes appeared in two episodes of the British science-fiction drama series Doctor Who in "Daleks in Manhattan" and "Evolution of the Daleks", in which he played 'Laszlo', who was turned into a half-human, half-pig slave. In the 2008 horror film Trailer Park of Terror, based on the Imperium comic series of the same name, Carnes plays an arrogant teenager called Alex. He also starred as the title character in the Syfy miniseries The Phantom, based on Lee Falk's comic strip of the same name.

It was reported on December 11, 2013, that Carnes would reprise the role of Lucas on General Hospital, returning on January 17, 2014. He then returned for short periods in 2017 and again as recurring from 2018 onward. Carnes left General Hospital in March 2020, and the role was recast in November.

Filmography

References

External links
 

1982 births
21st-century American male actors
American male film actors
American male soap opera actors
American male television actors
Duke University alumni
Living people
Male actors from Illinois
People from Pittsfield, Illinois